The Königsberg Colour-head Tumbler is a breed of fancy pigeon developed in the mid-18th century in Königsberg, East Prussia, from which it gets its German name.  This breed of pigeon is well known in Russia because Königsberg is now a part of Russia, and is known as Kaliningrad.

General Impression 
The Königsberg Colour-head comes in the colours black, red, white, yellow, and blue.

Their rudders and heads can be of any of the above colours. Conformance standards for this breed require perfect body posture and high carriage.

Flying 
They are mostly kept as fancy (show) pigeons, but with regular training they can be taught to fly well.

Keeping 
Keeping and breeding requires care. The breed is brevirostrate, which can cause difficulty in breeding and keeping. A good breeding program requires foster-parents, usually medium-beaked and long-beaked pigeons.

See also 
List of pigeon breeds

References

 Königsberger Farbenköpfe Deutschen Rassetauben-Standard

External links
Königsberg colored tail owl ''Pigeons of Russia
Königsberg colored  Pigeons of Russia

Pigeon breeds
Pigeon breeds originating in Germany
Pigeon breeds originating in Prussia